Idiataphe is a genus of dragonflies in the family Libellulidae. They occur from northeastern Argentina, through Brazil and the Antilles to Florida.

The genus contains the following species:
Idiataphe amazonica 
Idiataphe batesi 
Idiataphe cubensis  – metallic pennant
Idiataphe longipes

References

Libellulidae
Anisoptera genera